The Foundation Review is a peer-reviewed academic journal that publishes articles for foundation staff. It covers evaluation results, tools, issues confronting the philanthropic sector, and reflective practice. The journal's editor in chief is Teresa (Teri) Behrens of Grand Valley State University. The journal was established in 2009 and is published quarterly by the Dorothy A. Johnson Center for Philanthropy.

The Foundation Review is a hybrid journal, with a mix of subscriber-only and open-access content. Sponsored issues are open access. For non-sponsored issues, individual authors can pay an open-access fee. All content becomes open access after two years.

Abstracting and indexing 

The Foundation Review is abstracted and indexed in Scopus and the Emerging Sources Citation Index and in the databases EBSCO, Gale, and ProQuest.

References

External links 

 
 Johnson Center for Philanthropy

Philanthropy
English-language journals
Quarterly journals
Publications established in 2009